Christopher Michael Reddy (born 1969) is an American scientist at the Woods Hole Oceanographic Institution (WHOI).  

Reddy's research spans from the source, fate and transport of combustion-derived materials, PCBs, and DDT to the environmental chemistry of oil spills, biofuels, plastics, nanoparticles, as well as developing environmentally friendly products.

Reddy attended public schools in Rhode Island, earning a BS in chemistry from Rhode Island College and PhD in chemical oceanography from the Graduate School of Oceanography at the University of Rhode Island. Reddy also has an executive education certificate in management and leadership from MIT's Sloan School of Business and leadership training from Harvard University's Kennedy School of Government.

Reddy has published over 200 peer-reviewed manuscripts and book chapters and holds eight U.S. patents.

Reddy has testified before the US Congress five times, written more than 20 opinion pieces, and given hundreds of interviews for print, radio, and television. 

Reddy gave a TEDx talk using clips from the original Star Trek television series on what science can provide during a crisis. In 2014, he was honored with the C.C. Patterson Award for his work on the impacts of petroleum in the ocean, and in 2018, the American Geophysical Union recognized Reddy’s achievements as a science communicator with the Ambassador Award.

https://www.bostonglobe.com/2020/03/31/opinion/lessons-deepwater-horizon-coronvavirus/

Woods Hole Oceanographic Institution
1969 births
Living people